SM UB-107 was a German Type UB III submarine or U-boat in the German Imperial Navy during World War I. She was commissioned into the German Imperial Navy on 16 February 1918 as SM UB-107.

Construction

UB-107 was ordered by the GIN on 23 September 1916. She was built by Blohm & Voss of Hamburg and following just under a year of construction, launched at Hamburg on 21 July 1917. UB-107 was commissioned early the next year . Like all Type UB III submarines, UB-107 carried 10 torpedoes and was armed with a  deck gun. UB-107 had a displacement of  while surfaced and  when submerged. Her engines enabled her to travel at  when surfaced and  when submerged.

Fate
The first recorded fate of UB-107 was noted as sunk by depth charge on July 27, 1918 by the Royal Navy trawler Calvia and destroyer Vanessa  at position . It has since been argued that the UB-107 was probably not present for the attack by Calvis and Vanessa  as it was the only U-boat that could have been responsible for the sinking of steamers Chloris and John Rettig two and a half hours later at position .

UB-107 was identified by the markings on her propellers. It is suggested that either UB-107 suffered an accident of some sort or was lost on a British mine between July 28 and August 3, 1918 leaving all hands lost (38 dead).

Summary of raiding history

Television Documentary
The fate of UB-107 was the subject of an episode of the documentary television series Deep Sea Detectives: "Mystery U-Boat of WWI".  The documentary offered various scenarios for the sinking based on historical evidence and exploratory diving at the wreck site.

References

Notes

Citations

Bibliography 

 

Paul Kemp : U-Boats Destroyed (1997) Arms & Armour

External links
MaritimeQuest Daily Event SMS UB-107

German Type UB III submarines
World War I submarines of Germany
U-boats commissioned in 1918
1917 ships
Ships built in Hamburg
U-boats sunk in 1918
U-boats sunk by depth charges
U-boats sunk by British warships
World War I shipwrecks in the North Sea
Ships lost with all hands
Maritime incidents in 1918
Protected Wrecks of the United Kingdom